is an action role-playing video game developed by Creatures Inc., published by The Pokémon Company and distributed by Nintendo for the Nintendo DS. It is the sequel to Pokémon Ranger and Pokémon Ranger: Shadows of Almia and it is the third installment of its series. It was released in Japan on March 6, 2010, North America on October 4, 2010, and Europe on November 5, 2010. It was released on the European Wii U Virtual Console on June 9, 2016. Gameplay revolves around capturing Pokémon with the Capture Styler by drawing circles around them. The game received mixed or average reviews, with Metacritic and GameRankings both giving it a 69%.

Gameplay
Pokémon Ranger: Guardian Signs is an action role-playing game in which gameplay revolves around capturing Pokémon with the Capture Styler by drawing circles around them. If the Pokémon breaks through the drawn circles by using attacks on them, then the styler's health goes down, and runs out of energy. When energy reaches 0, the styler breaks and the game resumes from the last save point. However, if, for example, the Pokémon walks through the styler's line without using an attack, the styler's line will break, but the styler does not take damage. Capturing Pokémon and completing missions increases XP, which can lead to styler upgrades, such as power upgrade and energy upgrade. After a certain point, the styler can be charged in order to be more effective. One of the new features lets you call out your Pokémon for support and to help in captures. The player can use "Guardian Signs" (also referred to in the game as "Ranger Signs" or "Emblems" by drawing certain symbols, to summon Legendary Pokémon like Entei, Raikou, and Suicune and use them outside of battle. Other features include four player cooperative play with unique missions. The game also includes Wi-Fi mission downloads, one of which gives you access to Deoxys, which can be moved to the DS's other Pokémon games.

Plot

The game takes place on the island region of Oblivia. The player, and a friend and fellow Ranger, Summer (Ben, if the player is  female), are flying on Staraptors in the clouds, chasing after Pokémon Pinchers after Latios (Latias for female players). The player allows Latios/Latias to escape by distracting the Pinchers. However, when their squad leader, Red Eyes comes in, the player's partner taunts Red Eyes. He responds by shooting a plasma gun. The player moves forward and shields their partner from the blow, and is sent into the sea below, where the player loses and eventually recovers their styler. (The player's partner is then kidnapped.) The player washes up on a beach- the shores of Dolce Island. The player meets a Pichu with a ukulele, who is known throughout the game as the Ukulele Pichu. This Pichu becomes the partner Pokémon of this game. It will join the player as their Partner Pokémon, after they fix its broken ukulele. As a newly recruited Pokémon Ranger, the player would go on various missions and encounter friends, foes, and rivals, not to mention hordes of Pokémon. The new enemy, the Pokémon Pinchers, are controlling Pokémon and using them to their advantage. With newly found Pokémon companions at their side, the player begins their journey to put a stop to the Pokémon Pinchers and restore peace in Oblivia.

Development
Pokémon Ranger: Guardian Signs was developed by Creatures Inc. for the Nintendo DS. It was first revealed on January 13, 2010, by Japan's CoroCoro Comic, which had first details about the games. On January 15, Nintendo Japan made an official announcement for the game, and provided screenshots and artwork. It was released in Japan on March 6, 2010, North America on October 4, 2010, and Europe on November 5, 2010.

Reception

The game received mixed or average reviews according to the review aggregator Metacritic. GamePro rated the game 3/5 stars, stating "Guardian Signs isn't much of a departure from the last two titles in the series". IGNs Kristine Steimer rated the game 7/10, stating the graphics of "the different environments look really sharp" and "The music depicts the mood of the story very well". GamesRadar+ rated the game 6/10, stating that the "Guardian Signs is a great game for small children, but is too simplistic for the rest of us." GameZone rated the game 6.5/10, and commented "The visuals of Guardian Signs actually surprised me... both the characters and the world of Oblivia contain more details than the main Pokemon games."

It was the top selling game in Japan for the week of March 1 through March 7, selling 161,000 copies. It stayed at the top the next week, selling 65,000 copies. It continued to stay on the charts, selling 360,000 copies in the game's first month.

References

External links

Official Site In Japanese

Role-playing video games
Action role-playing video games
Video games featuring protagonists of selectable gender
Video game sequels
Nintendo DS games
2010 video games
Video games developed in Japan
Video games set on fictional islands
Virtual Console games for Wii U
Ranger

ja:ポケモンレンジャー#ポケモンレンジャー 光の軌跡